is a railway station on the Iida Line in the town of Iijima, Kamiina District, Nagano Prefecture, Japan, operated by Central Japan Railway Company (JR Central).

Lines
Iijima Station is served by the Iida Line and is 157.9 kilometers from the starting point of the line at Toyohashi Station.

Station layout
The station consists of two ground-level opposed side platforms connected by a level crossing.

Platforms

Adjacent stations

History
Iijima Station opened on 11 February 1918. With the privatization of Japanese National Railways (JNR) on 1 April 1987, the station came under the control of JR Central.

Passenger statistics
In fiscal 2016, the station was used by an average of 290 passengers daily (boarding passengers only).

Surrounding area
Iijima town hall
Iijima Post Office
Iijima Elementary School
Iijima Junior High School

See also
 List of railway stations in Japan

References

External links

 Iijima Station information 

Railway stations in Nagano Prefecture
Railway stations in Japan opened in 1918
Stations of Central Japan Railway Company
Iida Line
Iijima, Nagano